Mamayev Kurgan is a dominant height overlooking the city of Volgograd (formerly Stalingrad) in Southern Russia. The name in Russian means "tumulus of Mamai". 
The formation is dominated by a memorial complex commemorating the Battle of Stalingrad (August 1942 to February 1943). The battle, a hard-fought Soviet victory over Axis forces on the Eastern Front of World War II, turned into one of the bloodiest battles in human history. At the time of its installation in 1967 the statue, named The Motherland Calls, formed the largest free-standing sculpture in the world; today it is the tallest sculpture of a woman in the world.

Battle 

When forces of the German Sixth Army launched their attack against the city centre of Stalingrad on 13 September 1942, Mamayev Kurgan (appearing in military maps as "Height 102.0") saw particularly fierce fighting between the German attackers and the defending soldiers of the Soviet 62nd Army. Control of the hill became vitally important, as it offered control over the city. To defend it, the Soviets had built strong defensive lines on the slopes of the hill, composed of trenches, barbed-wire and minefields. The Germans pushed forward against the hill, taking heavy casualties. When they finally captured the hill, they started firing on the city centre, as well as on the city's main railway station under the hill. They captured the Volgograd railway station on 14 September 1942.

On the same day, the Soviet 13th Guards Rifle Division commanded by Alexander Rodimtsev arrived in the city from the east side of the river Volga under heavy German artillery fire. The division's 10,000 men immediately rushed into the battle. On 16 September they recaptured Mamayev Kurgan and kept fighting for the railway station, taking heavy losses. By the following day, almost all of them had died. The Soviets kept reinforcing their units in the city as fast as they could. The Germans assaulted up to twelve times a day, and the Soviets would respond with fierce counter-attacks.

The hill changed hands several times. By September 27, the Germans again captured half of Mamayev Kurgan. The Soviets held their own positions on the slopes of the hill, as the 284th Rifle Division defended the key stronghold. The defenders held out until January 26 1943, when the counterattacking Soviet forces relieved them. The battle of the city ended one week later with an utter German defeat.

When the battle ended, the soil on the hill had been so thoroughly churned by shellfire and mixed with metal fragments that it contained between 500 and 1,250 splinters of metal per square meter. The earth on the hill had remained black in the winter, as the snow kept melting in the many fires and explosions. In the following spring the hill would still remain black, as no grass grew on its scorched soil. The hill's formerly steep slopes had become flattened in months of intense shelling and bombardment. Even today, it is possible to find fragments of bone and metal still buried deep throughout the hill.

Memorial complex 

After the war, the Soviet authorities commissioned the enormous Mamayev Kurgan memorial complex. Vasily Chuikov, who led Soviet forces at Stalingrad, lies buried at Mamayev Kurgan, the only Marshal of the Soviet Union to be buried outside Moscow. Among the other people buried there, sniper Vasily Zaytsev was also reburied there in 2006.

The monumental memorial was constructed between 1959 and 1967, and is crowned by a huge allegorical statue of the Motherland on the top of the hill. The monument, designed by Yevgeny Vuchetich, has the full name The Motherland Calls! ( Rodina Mat Zovyot!). It consists of a concrete sculpture, 52 meters tall, and 85 meters from the feet to the tip of the 27-meters sword, dominating the skyline of the city of Stalingrad (later renamed Volgograd).

The construction uses concrete, except for the stainless-steel blade of the sword, and is held on its plinth solely by its own weight. The statue is evocative of classical Greek representations of Nike, in particular the flowing drapery, similar to that of the Nike of Samothrace.

See also
Museum of the Great Patriotic War, Kyiv
Mound of Glory

References

External links

 Mamayev Hill museum in Volgograd, official homepage (in Russian, English, German).
 Gigapixel panoramas, created on 9 May 2005 for Google Earth, 60 years after the end of the war in Russia
 Iconicarchive photo gallery
 Satellite photo at Google Maps

Battle of Stalingrad
Cemeteries in Russia
Commemorative mounds
Hills of Russia
Kurgans
Soviet military memorials and cemeteries
World War II memorials in Russia
Buildings and structures in Volgograd
Tourist attractions in Volgograd Oblast
Landforms of Volgograd Oblast
Monuments and memorials in Volgograd
Cultural heritage monuments of federal significance in Volgograd Oblast